The National Intelligence Reform Medal is an award of the United States Intelligence Community's National Intelligence Awards Program that recognizes extraordinary service in implementing the Intelligence Reform and Terrorism Prevention Act. The medal ranks below the National Intelligence Superior Service Medal, but above the National Intelligence Exceptional Achievement Medal. Established 23 May 2007 with the creation of the National Intelligence Awards Program, it was retired in November 2010.

Notable recipients
Melissa Hathaway, former director of the Joint Interagency Cyber Task Force, Office of the Director of National Intelligence
Robert V. Hoppa, US Navy rear admiral and former director of the National Maritime Intelligence-Integration Office
Thomas P. Meek, retired US Navy rear admiral and former director of Military Support for the National Geospatial-Intelligence Agency
Michael Morell, retired deputy director of the Central Intelligence Agency
Al Tarasiuk, Associate Director of National Intelligence and Chief Information Officer

See also
 Awards and decorations of the United States government

References

External links

Valor, National Intelligence Medal for